The Sheldrick Wildlife Trust operates an orphan elephant rescue and wildlife rehabilitation program in Kenya. It was founded in 1977 by Dame Daphne Sheldrick to honor her late husband, David Sheldrick. Since 2001, it has been run by their daughter, Angela Sheldrick.

History 
For over 25 years Kenya-born Daphne Sheldrick lived and worked alongside her husband, David Sheldrick, a naturalist and founding warden of Tsavo East National Park. Throughout this time, they raised and successfully rehabilitated many wild animal species. Daphne was the first person to have perfected the milk formula and necessary husbandry for infant milk-dependent elephants, discovering that coconut oil was the nearest substitute for the fat in elephant milk.

After the death of her husband in 1977, Daphne and her family lived and worked in the Nairobi National Park. In 1987, the David Sheldrick Memorial Appeal, a part of the African Wildlife Project, metamorphosed into the David Sheldrick Wildlife Trust; becoming an independent non-profit organization. The organization re-branded their name and logo on February 1, 2019, changing their name from the David Sheldrick Wildlife Trust to the Sheldrick Wildlife Trust in order to honor both David and Daphne Sheldrick.

The Sheldrick Wildlife Trust raises orphaned baby elephants and integrates them back in the wild. The trust is a leader in conservation efforts to help save the remaining African elephant populations in grave danger from the illegal ivory trade. The Sheldrick Wildlife Trust's Elephant Orphanage is located in Nairobi National Park, Kenya and is open to the public for one hour every day.

Programs and projects
The Sheldrick Wildlife Trust operates a digital foster program which allows individuals to support their field projects by fostering an orphaned elephant, rhino or giraffe in their care.

The Sheldrick Wildlife Trust travels throughout Kenya to rescue orphaned African Elephants and Black rhinos, along with other animals like Giraffes, Hippos, and White rhinos. Many of the orphaned animals rescued are victims of poaching and human-wildlife conflict. Following rescue, orphaned animals are taken to the DSWT's Nursery in the Nairobi National Park for rehabilitation.

To combat ivory, bushmeat and rhino horn poaching, the Sheldrick Wildlife Trust operates Anti-Poaching Units in partnership with the Kenya Wildlife Service (KWS).

The Sheldrick Wildlife Trust operates a specialist Canine Unit with three Belgian Malinois who have been trained to track and detect illegal wildlife products such as ivory, rhino horn and bush meat as well as guns and ammunition. 

Supporting the Sheldrick Wildlife Trust's ground efforts is an Aerial Unit, which takes part in security patrols and provides support to search and veterinary intervention for injured elephants and wildlife, as well as search and rescue operations for orphaned elephant calves and wildlife emergencies.

The Sheldrick Wildlife Trust operates four Mobile Veterinary Units and a Sky Vet initiative headed by Kenya Wildlife Service Vets to alleviate the suffering of injured wild animals. The Tsavo Mobile Veterinary Unit based at the KWS Voi Headquarters, covers an extensive area including the greater Tsavo Conservation Area as well as the Chyulu Hills National Park and the Shimba Hills National Reserve. The Mara Mobile Veterinary Unit covers the Masai Mara National Reserve, the adjacent Mara Triangle, neighbouring community areas, as well as the Lake Naivasha and Nakuru areas within the Rift Valley; when needed the unit also operates as far West as Ruma National Park and Lake Victoria. The Meru Mobile Veterinary Unit operates out of Meru National Park and provides permanent veterinary support to the larger Meru ecosystem consisting of Meru National Park, Bisanadi National Park and Kora National Reserve, including all wildlife dispersal areas around the Eastern Conservation Area, whilst also extending its services into additional parks and reserves in the Northern Conservation Area. The Amboseli Mobile Veterinary Unit operates out of Amboseli National Park and services the Southern Conservation Area encompassing Kajiado, Namanga, Magadi, Lake Natron as well as the Southern Tsavo West area including Lake Jipe, an ecosystem famous for large number of elephants. The Sky Vet initiative funds and coordinates the deployment of KWS vets to emergency wildlife cases throughout Kenya by air and is a vital addition to the DSWT's veterinary program. Between Sky Vets and the four units over 1,500 wild elephants have been assisted and the lives of countless other species have been saved.

With agriculture and human settlement encroaching into wildlife habitats, disrupting migratory routes and protected boundaries, the Sheldrick Wildlife Trust has been erecting and maintaining hundreds of kilometres of fencelines to limit this growing conflict over natural resources.

With limited rainfall in the arid Tsavo Conservation Area, the Sheldrick Wildlife Trust has built 14 boreholes and windmills to enhance the dry season productivity, as well as instigating temporary water-relief programs to relieve suffering.

In partnership with the Kenya Forest Service, the Sheldrick Wildlife Trust has embarked on conserving and sustaining the environment in the Kibwezi Forest. The Forest, one of Kenya's last remaining groundwater woodlands, is a unique ecosystem bordering the Chyulu Hills National Park and an exceptional biodiversity hotspot providing a habitat for a number of wildlife species, including the African elephant as well as an impressive collection of rare and endemic mammals, birds, reptiles, butterflies, invertebrates and fish.

The Sheldrick Wildlife Trust also operates a community outreach project, working to improve the livelihoods and educational standards of people living along the borders of Kenya's National Parks and protected areas through the introduction of community initiatives and local employment.

References

See also
 Pinnawala Elephant Orphanage, established in 1975 by the Sri Lanka Department of Wildlife Conservation

References

 BBC, Elephant Diaries: BBC - Science & Nature - Elephant Diaries
 Buchanan, Gordon (2016), Elephant Family And Me. BBC: BBC Two - Gordon Buchanan: Elephant Family & Me
 For the Love of Elephants (2010). CBC: FOR THE LOVE OF ELEPHANTS
 Born to be Wild (2011). 
 Dr Dame Daphne Sheldrick (2012). Love, Life and Elephants. An African Love Story: Sheldrick Wildlife Trust USA Merchandise
 Gardeners of Eden (2014): Sheldrick Wildlife Trust: Haven for Elephants & Rhinos
 WILD (2014): WILD :: The David Sheldrick Wildlife Trust
 iworry campaign, The Sheldrick Wildlife Trust: Die IWorry Webseite befindet sich aktuell im Umbau
 Siebert, Charles (Sept 2011) Orphans No More. National Geographic: http://www.sheldrickwildlifetrust.org/PDF/nationalgeographicarticle.pdf
 Brandford, Rob (2016) Saving Elephants. Africa Geographic: http://magazine.africageographic.com/weekly/issue-103/saving-elephants/
 Neme, Laurel (2013) Elephant Foster Mom: A Conversation with Daphne Sheldrick. National Geographic: Elephant Foster Mom: A Conversation with Daphne Sheldrick
 BBC (2016) One woman's mission to save orphaned elephants. BBC: https://www.bbc.co.uk/news/magazine-38019026

External links

Official Website

Wildlife conservation in Kenya
Elephant conservation organizations
Wildlife sanctuaries of Kenya
Protected areas established in 1977
Organizations established in 1977
Environmental organisations based in Kenya
1977 establishments in Kenya